Maricet Espinosa (born 2 January 1990) is a Cuban judoka. She competed at the 2016 Summer Olympics in the women's 63 kg event, in which she was eliminated in the second round by Yarden Gerbi.

References

External links
 
 

1990 births
Living people
Cuban female judoka
Olympic judoka of Cuba
Judoka at the 2016 Summer Olympics